Chahar Gol Ali Mohammad (also Romanized as Chahār Gol ʿAlī Moḩammad) is a village in Deraz Kola Rural District, Babol Kenar District, Babol County, Mazandaran Province, Iran. At the 2006 census, its population was 25, in 9 families.

References 

Populated places in Babol County